Marek Kodr (born 17 August 1996) is a professional Czech footballer who plays as a defender for S.S. Arezzo.

He made his career league debut for SK Slavia Prague on 10 August 2014 in a 4–1 home win against FC Slovan Liberec, one week before his 18th birthday.

References
 
 

1996 births
Living people
Czech footballers
Czech Republic youth international footballers
Czech expatriate footballers
Association football defenders
SK Slavia Prague players
FK Varnsdorf players
FK Baník Sokolov players
FC Slavoj Vyšehrad players
1. FK Příbram players
S.S. Arezzo players
Czech First League players
Czech National Football League players
Serie C players
Expatriate footballers in Italy
Czech expatriate sportspeople in Italy
Footballers from Prague